The women's competition in the –69 kg division was held on 23–24 October 2013 in Centennial Hall, Wrocław, Poland.

Schedule

Medalists

Records

 Liu Chunhong's world records were rescinded in 2017.

Results

References

Results 
Results

2013 World Weightlifting Championships
World